Syke or SYKE may refer to:

Places 
 Syke, a town in Lower Saxony, Germany
 Syke (Cilicia), a town of ancient Cilicia

People 
 Big Syke (1968–2016), American rapper
 Syke Pachino (born 1978), Spanish-American hip-hop artist

Other uses
 Syke, a Finnish television series
 Syke or sike, term for ravine or narrow valley in parts of the UK
 Syke railway station, serving Syke, Germany
 Finnish Environment Institute
 Fountain (heraldry), a roundel

See also 
 Sike (disambiguation)